The 2017–18 Combined Counties Football League season (known as the 2017–18 Cherry Red Records Combined Counties Football League for sponsorship reasons) was the 40th in the history of the Combined Counties Football League, a football competition in England.

The constitution was announced on 26 May 2017.

Premier Division

The Premier Division was reduced from 23 to 22 clubs, and featured four new teams after the promotion of Hartley Wintney to the Southern League, the transfer of Windsor to the Hellenic League, and the relegation of Badshot Lea, Bedfont & Feltham and Raynes Park Vale to the First Division:

Balham, promoted as third-placed club in Division One.
Banstead Athletic, promoted as champions of Division One.
Godalming Town, relegated from Isthmian League.
Redhill, promoted as runners-up in Division One.

With the suspension of ground grading Grade E for this season and the creation of a new league at Steps 3 and 4, the champions of all Step 5 leagues were compulsorily promoted to Step 4. Of the fourteen runners-up, the twelve clubs with the best PPG (points per game ratio) were also to be compulsorily promoted, but with resignations and mergers in leagues above, thirteen runners-up were promoted.

Teams at Step 5 without ground grading Grade F were to be relegated to Step 6, but no club in this division failed the ground grading process. All Step 5 leagues were fixed at 20 clubs for 2018–19, but in this case there were no further relegations or reprieves.

League table

Division One

Division One was increased from 18 to 19 clubs, and featured six new teams after Balham, Banstead Athletic and Redhill were promoted to the Premier Division, and Dorking and Epsom Athletic left the league:

Badshot Lea, relegated from the Premier Division.
Bedfont & Feltham, relegated from the Premier Division.
FC Deportivo Galicia, promoted from the Middlesex County League.
Fleet Spurs, transferred from the Wessex League
Kensington Borough, transferred from the Spartan South Midlands League.
Raynes Park Vale, relegated from the Premier Division.
Reserve sides are not eligible for promotion to Step 5.

Step 6 clubs without ground grading Grade G were to be relegated to Step 7, and three clubs in this division failed the ground grading process. All Step 6 leagues were fixed at a maximum of 20 clubs for 2018–19, but in this case there were no further relegations or reprieves.

League table

References

External links
 Combined Counties League Official Site

2017-18
9